Woodlawn High School may refer to:

United States 

 Woodlawn High School (Birmingham, Alabama)
 Woodlawn High School (Arkansas) in Rison, Arkansas
 Woodlawn High School (East Baton Rouge Parish, Louisiana)
 Woodlawn High School (Shreveport, Louisiana)
 Woodlawn High School (Baltimore) in Baltimore County, Maryland
 Woodlawn High School (Pennsylvania) in Aliquippa, Pennsylvania
 Woodlawn High School (Woodlawn, Virginia), defunct

Canada 
 Woodlawn High School (Nova Scotia), formerly called Prince Andrew High School until 2022

See also
H-B Woodlawn, a 6–12 public school in Arlington, Virginia
Woodlawn School (disambiguation)